Richard Patterson (born 1963 in Leatherhead, Surrey) is an English artist and one of the Young British Artists (YBAs).  He is currently based in Dallas, Texas. Patterson's work is primarily painterly, but occasionally morphs into three-dimensional works as well.

Education
Patterson attended a Watford College of Art and Design Course from 1982 to 1983.  He received a B.A. Honors degree in Fine Art from Goldsmiths' (1983–86).

Solo exhibitions
 1995 "Richard Patterson: Motocrosser", Project Space, Anthony d'Offay Gallery, London, England
 1997 Anthony d'Offay Gallery, London, England (exhibition catalogue, text by Stuart Morgan)
 1999 James Cohan Gallery, New York City (exhibition catalogue)
 2000 "Concentration 35: Richard Patterson", Dallas Museum of Art, Dallas, Texas, USA (exhibition brochure with essay by Suzanne Weaver)
 2002 James Cohan Gallery, New York City
 2005 Timothy Taylor Gallery, London
 2013 Timothy Taylor Gallery, London

See also
 Young British Artists
 Freeze

References

External links
 Tate Britain, London
 Tate Collection, London

1963 births
Living people
People from Leatherhead
Alumni of Goldsmiths, University of London
English contemporary artists